Field hockey at the 2018 Asian Games in Jakarta and Palembang was held at the GBK Hockey Field, Jakarta, Indonesia from 19 August to 1 September 2018. A total of twelve men's and ten women's teams competed in each respective tournament.

The tournaments served as qualification for the 2020 Summer Olympics.

Competition schedule 
All times are local Indonesia Western Standard Time (UTC+7).

Medal summary

Medal table

Medalists

Qualification

Men's qualification

Women's qualification

Men's competition

The competition consisted of two stages; a preliminary round followed by a final round.

Preliminary round

Pool A

Pool B

Final round

Women's competition

The competition consisted of two stages; a preliminary round followed by a final round.

Preliminary round

Pool A

Pool B

Final round

References

External links
Official Result Book – Hockey

 
2018 Asian Games events
2018
Asian Games
2018 Asian Games